Omicron Delta Kappa, also known as The Circle and ODK, is a prestigious honor society located in the United States with chapters at more than 300 college campuses. It was founded December 3, 1914, at Washington and Lee University in Lexington, Virginia, by 15 student and faculty leaders. The society recognizes achievement in five areas: scholarship; athletics; campus and community service, social or religious activities, and campus government; journalism, speech and the mass media; and creative and performing arts. Some circles of ΟΔΚ are quasi-secret, in that newly selected members remain undisclosed for some time.

Membership in the Omicron Delta Kappa Society is regarded as a high honor in the tradition of Phi Kappa Phi, Phi Beta Kappa and Tau Beta Pi.  To be selected as a member of ΟΔΚ, one must stand among the top 35 percent of all students at that particular institution and hold a leadership role in one of the society's five areas of recognition.

History

Founding
On december 3, 1914, the Omicron Delta Kappa Society was founded by fifteen men who gathered in a small office on the third floor of Reid Hall on the campus of Washington and Lee University. J.  Carl Fisher first introduced the idea of creating such a society to a close friend, Rupert Latture.  The two soon included mutual friend William Brown in the discussion, and thus these three are referred to as the principal founders of the society.  Together with three faculty members, including the president of the University and the dean of Engineering, they gradually selected nine others to join them. The complete list of the fifteen founders is as follows.

James Edwin Bear, ΒΘΠ, editor of the student magazine
William Moseley Brown, ΔΚΕ, ΦΒΚ, debater, a president of the YMCA
Carl Shaffer Davidson, ΚΣ, student instructor in civil engineering
Edward Parks Davis, ΚΣ, athlete
Edward A. Donahue, ΦΚΣ, captain of football and baseball
De la Warr Benjamin Easter, PhD, ΚΣ, ΦΒΚ, professor, and the founding president of ΟΔΚ
James Carl Fisher, business manager of the student magazine, founder of the campus radio station
Philip Pendleton Gibson, ΠΚΑ, president of student government, editor of the student newspaper
Thomas McPheeters Glasgow, ΦΔΘ, orator, athlete
David Carlisle Humphreys, FIJI, professor and dean of the School of Applied Science
Rupert Nelson Latture, ΔΥ, ΦΒΚ, a president of the YMCA
John Eppes Martin, ΑΧΡ, business manager of the yearbook
William Caulfield Raftery, ΦΚΣ, athlete
John Purver Richardson, Jr., ΣΧ, instructor in biology
Henry Louis Smith, PhD, ΦΔΘ, ΦΒΚ, president of Washington and Lee University

All 15 men were prominent leaders on campus, and they rallied around the idea that all-around leadership in college should be recognized, that representative men in all phases of college life should cooperate in worthwhile endeavors, and that outstanding students and faculty should affiliate in the spirit of mutual interest and understanding. The founders intended that ΟΔΚ not be yet another society in which members would simply earn a societal Key and then be done.  Members of ΟΔΚ would remain active as leaders, in upholding spiritual and moral values, and in rendering service to the campus and community.

The founders decided that The Circle would be kept a complete secret until keys could be designed and produced. The keys arrived shortly  past the winter holiday, and each man first wore his key on the 15th of January in 1915. The student newspaper, the Ring-Tum Phi, broke the news in the issue dated January 12, 1915, of a new society to be known as "The Circle," with the secret significance of its three Greek letters known only to its members.

Purpose of the Society
The Purpose of the Society is threefold:
 First, to recognize those who have attained a high standard of efficiency in collegiate activities and to inspire others to strive for conspicuous attainments along similar lines;
 Second, to bring together the most representative students in all phases of collegiate life and thus to create an organization which will help to mold the sentiment of the institution on questions of local and intercollegiate interest;
 Third, to bring together members of the faculty and student body of the institution, as well as other Omicron Delta Kappa members, in the spirit of mutual interest and understanding.

Women in ODK
Only men could become members of Omicron Delta Kappa in the first 60 years of its existence. At the 1970 and 1972 National Conventions, the University of Alabama Circle introduced an amendment to the National Constitution to admit women into the Society.  In June 1972, Title IX of the "Education Amendments Act of 1972" prohibited sex discrimination in federally assisted educational programs and amended parts of the Civil Rights Act of 1964. Professional and honor fraternities were included in Title IX. The Special Committee on the Possible Role of Women met in January 1973 and recommended changes to the National Constitution that would abolish segregation based on gender within the Society. On March 12, 1974. the National Convention convened in New Orleans and approved the initiation of women into the Society. On that date, the first women members were recognized by the Society. They were the Carolyn Julia Kucinski and Diane Christine Ragosa of the Newark College of Engineering Circle, and Robbie Lynn Cooney, Maria Dolores Delvalle, Roxane R. Dow, Catherine Ann Rohrbacher, Karen Diane Janzer, Linda Ann Touten, Martha Gwyn Van Deman, and Cathy Sue Welch of the  University of South Florida Circle.

Cheryl Hogle was elected as the first woman National President at the Convention in Knoxville, Tennessee on February 25, 1998. After serving four terms as a Faculty Province Director and two terms as National Vice President for Extension, she was elected by unanimous vote of the Convention. On June 26, 2010, the ODK National Leadership Summit and Convention elected Dr. Betsy Holloway as the 34th National President, the second female to be elected.

On March 22, 1992, the National Convention passed a resolution authorizing the incorporation of the Society. On July 1, 1992, the Omicron Delta Kappa Society was merged into the corporation, The Omicron Delta Kappa Society, Inc.

Today it participates in a more loosely coordinated lobbying association of four of the nation's oldest and most prestigious honor societies, all independent, called the Honor Society Caucus. Its members include Phi Beta Kappa, Phi Kappa Phi, Sigma Xi, and Omicron Delta Kappa.

Relationship with Mortar Board
A similar honorary society, for exceptionally outstanding women leaders, known as Mortar Board, had been established just a few years after ODK, in 1918, with many similar ideals and purposes.  With the passage of Title IX in 1972, each of those two societies was then required to accept candidates of either gender into its membership.  As a result, the two organizations found themselves competing to tap many of the same distinguished students, and those formerly complementary societies became rivals at many institutions, perhaps fiercely so during membership selection, while more congenially so during the rest of the year, as the two rivaled one another in service, athletics, or other campus activities.

Membership selection
Unlike the college honor societies that accept all potential members who meet the selection criteria and pay the required fees, O∆K chooses only a highly select group from a pool of potential and qualified students through a process known as tapping.  Eligibility for membership in O∆K requires at least sophomore academic standing.  Unlike Phi Beta Kappa, which limits membership to the liberal arts and sciences, O∆K contemplates candidates from every field of study who distinguish themselves as outstanding leaders in at least one of the five areas celebrated by O∆K:  scholarship; athletics; campus and community service, social or religious activities, and campus government; journalism, speech and the mass media; and creative and performing arts.  Members may be chosen either annually or semi-annually depending on the tradition of each individual circle.  The number of candidates  tapped each year is limited to thirty five percent of the undergraduate population, but most circles limit membership to fewer than the top one quarter of one percent of the students on their respective campuses.

Once a circle votes on who will be tapped for membership, it withholds that secret from all but those few chosen for initiation.  Once tapped, each candidate must maintain the secret until the circle reveals it to the campus and community in a public ceremony, only after the circle has initiated the new members into the bonds of the society through its private ritual.  At some institutions, such as the University of Missouri, with several such elite societies that tap new members, the public revelations are all held in conjunction, in an annual ceremonial Tap Day celebration on campus.

Circles

Omicron Delta Kappa uses the term circle to indicate chapters. As of March 16, 2023, 429 circles have been chartered. The practice of automatically designating circles with Greek letter names was abandoned in 1949, although some select circles have adopted nicknames in later years. Members who have died are said to have entered the Eternal Circle.

Notable members

Athletics
Griff Aldrich (Hampden-Sydney College 1996) Head coach of Longwood University.
Frank Beamer (Virginia Tech 1967) Head coach for Virginia Tech Hokies football team.
Terry Bowden (Auburn University 1994) College football head coach.
Paul "Bear" Bryant (University of Kentucky 1949) Longtime Head Coach for the University of Alabama football team.
Ron Fraser (University of Miami 1975) College Baseball Coach at University of Miami
Bob Griese (University of Miami 1988) NFL Quarterback for the Miami Dolphins
Gene Keady (Purdue University 1988) Longtime head coach for Purdue University basketball.
Archie Manning (University of Mississippi 1970) NFL quarterback for the New Orleans Saints, Houston Oilers, and Minnesota Vikings.
Peyton Manning (University of Tennessee 1997) NFL quarterback for the Denver Broncos
Rudy Niswanger (Louisiana State University 2005) NFL center for the Kansas City Chiefs
Arnold Palmer  (Wake Forest University 1964) Professional Golfer.
Joe Paterno (Pennsylvania State University 1976) Football Coach.
Gaylord Perry (Campbell University 1978) Professional Baseball Player and Cy Young Award winner.
James E. Perry (Campbell University 1978) Professional Baseball Player and two-time winner of Cy Young Award.
Homer Rice (Georgia institute of Technonogy, 1981) Football Coach and Athletic Director.
Myron Rolle (Florida State University 2008) Former safety for the FSU Seminoles and 2009 Rhodes Scholar
Adolph Rupp (University of Kentucky 1937) Longtime University of Kentucky basketball head coach.
Tubby Smith (University of Kentucky 2001) Men’s Basketball Coach
Steve Spurrier (University of Florida 1991) Heisman Trophy winner, NFL Quarterback, and Head Coach for the University of Florida, the Washington Redskins, and the South Carolina Gamecocks.
Bob Wolff (Duke University 1942) longest running sports broadcaster in television and radio history

Timothy Neal (Ohio University 1978) National Athletic Trainers’ Association Hall of Fame member

Business
Barry Bishop (Alpha Theta, 1953), geographer, researcher, and Executive Vice Chair of Research, National Geographic
Ely Callaway Jr. (Mu, 1940), American entrepreneur, textiles executive, winemaker, and golf club manufacturer
Dan Carmichael (Mu, 1967)
Robert S. Jepson, Jr. (Epsilon, 1963), chairman of the board and CEO of three corporations and a California winery, director of four other companies, founder of the Jepson School of Leadership Studies at the University of Richmond
Richard D. Kinder (Alpha Xi), CEO of Kinder Morgan, former president of Enron, ranked #46 on the 2011 Forbes 400 list of richest Americans. Kinder's net worth is more than $8.2 billion as of March 2012.
Kenneth L. Lay (Alpha Xi, 1964), former chairman and CEO of Enron
Clay Foster Lee, Jr. (Pi, 1951), retired Bishop of the United Methodist Church
S. Robson Walton (Beta Beta, 1965), chairman of Wal-Mart Stores, Inc., ranked #11 on the 2011 Forbes 400 list of richest Americans. Walton's net worth is $23.1 billion as of March 2012.

Education
William Hazell, fifth president of the New Jersey Institute of Technology
Thomas Hines, professor emeritus of history at the University of California, Los Angeles
Frank Hereford (Omicron), fifth president of the University of Virginia
Rudolph Rummel, professor emeritus of political science at the University of Hawaii who coined the term democide
Kenneth P. Ruscio (Alpha, 1975), 26th president of Washington and Lee University
Donna Shalala, fifth president of the University of Miami
Sidney A. McPhee (honoris causa initiate in 2010), tenth president of Middle Tennessee State University

Arts and entertainment
Yvette Nicole Brown (The University of Akron, 1994), actress and comedian
Scott Crary (State University of New York at Plattsburgh, 2000), director and producer
Sheryl S. Crow (University of Missouri, 1983), singer/songwriter, winner of nine Grammy Awards
Tara Dawn Holland (Florida State University, 1993), Miss America 1997
Douglass Wallop, (University of Maryland College Park, 1941), famous author, librettist of Damn Yankees

Government
Amy Coney Barrett (Rhodes College, 1994), Federal Judge, U.S. Court of Appeals for the Seventh Circuit, Associate Justice of the U.S. Supreme Court
Gordon R. England (University of Maryland College Park, 1963), 72nd U.S. Secretary of the Navy, Former U.S. Deputy Secretary of Defense, Former Deputy Secretary of Homeland Security
Donald Evans (University of Texas at Austin, 1971), 34th U.S. Secretary of Commerce
Martin Frost (University of Missouri, 1962), Political Commentator, Fox News Channel, former member of the U.S. House of Representatives for Texas's 24th congressional district
John R. Gibson (University of Missouri, 1948), Senior Federal Judge, U.S. Court of Appeals for the Eighth Circuit
Lewis Franklin Powell, Jr. (Washington and Lee University, 1928), former Associate Justice of the Supreme Court
Dean Rusk (Davidson College, 1930), 54th U.S. Secretary of State
Virginia Kilpatrick Shehee, (Centenary College, 1975), Shreveport businesswoman, first woman elected to the Louisiana State Senate, first woman in Omicron Delta Kappa
Lloyd F. Wheat, (Louisiana State University), member of the Louisiana State Senate from 1948 to 1952
Abe Fortas (Rhodes College, 1930), former Associate Justice of the Supreme Court

Journalism and mass media
Cokie Roberts (The University of Akron), American Emmy Award-winning journalist and bestselling author

Science and engineering
Anthony Joseph Arduengo III (Alpha Eta, 1972), Chemist, Professor of the Practice at the Georgia Institute of Technology and Saxon Professor Emeritus at the University of Alabama
Paul Alan Wetter, (University of Miami School of Medicine, 1975), Physician, Minimally Invasive and Robotic Surgery Pioneer and Innovator

Honorary members

Walter Williams – founded the Alpha Xi Circle at Missouri
Franklin D. Roosevelt – University of Maryland, 1940
E. F. L. Wood, 1st Earl of Halifax – University of Maryland, 1941
Hodding Carter – University of the South, 1953
Jonas E. Salk – University of Pittsburgh, 1954
Wernher von Braun – Grove City College, 1961
Joseph I. Goldstein – Washington and Lee University, 1961
Bob Hope – Tulane University, 1964
Jimmy Carter – Georgia State University, 1972
Edith Killgore Kirkpatrick – Louisiana State University, 1968
Walter Cronkite – Florida Southern College, 1979
Walter Mondale – University of South Carolina, 1981
Gerald R. Ford – Florida Southern College, 1984
F. Story Musgrave – University of Kentucky, 1984
Winston S. Churchill III – Florida Southern College, 1990
Margaret Thatcher – Harding University, 1995
George H. W. Bush – Harding University, 1997
Hillary Clinton – Alfred University, 2000
Joseph R. Biden, Jr. - University of Delaware, 1981
Nello L. Teer - Duke University, 1957

References

External links
Official Circle Website
ODK (Omicron Delta Kappa) Collection (MUM00598) at the University of Mississippi, Archives and Special Collections.

 
Honor societies
Washington and Lee University
Student organizations established in 1914
Former members of Association of College Honor Societies
1914 establishments in Virginia
Former members of Professional Fraternity Association